The 1902 Scottish Cup Final was played on 26 April 1902 at Celtic Park in Glasgow and was the deciding match of the 29th season of the Scottish Cup. The match had been scheduled to be played at Ibrox Park on 12 April, but the first Ibrox disaster occurred the week earlier during the annual Scotland v England game. This meant that the final was delayed by two weeks and moved to Celtic Park, although Celtic were one of the finalists. Hibernian and Celtic contested the match. Hibernian won the match 1–0, by the 75th-minute goal from Andy McGeachan. This was Hibernian's last Scottish Cup triumph for 114 years, until they won it again in 2016 by beating Rangers 3–2.

Final

Teams

References
 RSSSF: Scottish Cup 1901–02
 Scottish Football Archive

1902
Cup Final
Scottish Cup Final 1902
Scottish Cup Final 1902
1900s in Glasgow